Pancake sentences are a phenomenon in Scandinavian languages where sentence agreement does not follow conventional linguistic patterns. An example from Swedish is the sentence , literally translating to "Pancakes is healthy" and meaning "Eating pancakes is healthy".

The phrase appears to have been coined by Hans-Olav Enger in a 2004 academic paper, "Scandinavian pancake sentences as semantic agreement" but it was well-known also by classic grammar and was dubbed "constructio ad sensum" or "syllepsis"; see zeugma and syllepsis. Enger states that pancake sentences are "where the predicative adjective apparently disagrees with its subject". This phenomenon may be related or compared to English language linguistics, where American English speakers might say "", syntactically agreeing the singular team, versus British English speakers saying "", agreeing semantically to the collective noun team.

An example from Swedish is the sentence :

While  'pancakes' is plural and of common gender,  'healthy' is inflected to singular and neuter.

A similar phenomenon also occurs in Hebrew, where the copula (and adjectives) appear to disagree with the subject.

Sources

References 

2004 neologisms
Syntax
North Germanic languages